Anne Sutherland may refer to:

 Anne Sutherland (actress) (1867–1942), American actress
 Anne Bryson Sutherland (1922–2011), Scottish plastic surgeon

See also

 Ann Sutherland (born 1943), Welsh lawn and indoor bowler